Majewskia is a genus of fungi in the family Laboulbeniaceae. A monotypic genus, it contains the single species Majewskia japonica.

References

External links 

 Majewskia at Index Fungorum

Laboulbeniomycetes
Monotypic Laboulbeniomycetes genera